Fusobacterium is a genus of anaerobic, Gram-negative, non-sporeforming bacteria belonging to Gracilicutes. Individual cells are slender, rod-shaped bacilli with pointed ends.
Strains of Fusobacterium cause several human diseases, including periodontal diseases, Lemierre's syndrome, and topical skin ulcers.

Although older sources state that Fusobacterium is part of the normal flora of the human oropharynx, the current consensus is that Fusobacterium should always be treated as a pathogen. F. prausnitzii, a gut commensal associated with healthy patients, was completely reclassified as Faecalibacterium (Clostridiales:Ruminococcaceae) in 2002.

Clinical relevance
Fusobacterium is often associated with ulcerative colitis. Research of colon cancer has also shown an overrepresentation of Fusobacterium, both in feces of patients and tumor issue itself. Whether Fusobacterium causes these diseases or only colonizes existing tumours, remains undetermined.

The bacterium is a big anchor for biofilms. It is usually susceptible to clindamycin, while approximately 20% of the clinical strains are resistant to penicillin. In contrast to Bacteroides spp., Fusobacterium has a potent lipopolysaccharide.

Phylogeny

See also 
 Altered Schaedler flora
 List of bacteria genera
 List of bacterial orders

References

External links 
 Anaerobic Gram-Negative Bacilli chapter in Baron's Medical Microbiology (online at the NCBI bookshelf).
 Fusobacterium From MicrobeWiki, the student-edited microbiology resource

Gut flora bacteria
Fusobacteriota
Bacteria genera